Argophyllum ferrugineum is a plant in the Argophyllaceae family endemic to a small part of north eastern Queensland. It was described and named in 2018.

Taxonomy
This species was first described, along with a number of other new species in this genus, in 2018 by the Australian botanists Anthony Bean and Paul Forster who published it in the Journal Austrobaileya. The type specimen was collected in 1995 near Tully Falls by Forster.

Etymology
The genus name Argophyllum is derived from Ancient Greek Árgos meaning white or shining, and phúllon meaning leaf. It refers to the white colouration of the underside of the leaves. The species epithet ferrugineum is from the Latin ferrūgineus meaning rust-coloured, referring to the colour of the veins on the undersurface of the leaves.

Distribution and habitat
A. ferrugineum is restricted to a small area of the Wet Tropics of Queensland, mostly in the area of Tully Falls and Koolmoon Creek and with a disjunct population around Kirrama, west of Cardwell. It inhabits open forest and the edges of rainforest, usually along stream margins, on shallow rhyolite soils.

Conservation
This species is listed by the Queensland Department of Environment and Science as least concern. , it has not been assessed by the IUCN.

References

External links
 View a map of recorded sightings of Argophyllum ferrugineum at the Australasian Virtual Herbarium

Endemic flora of Australia
Flora of Queensland
Taxa named by Paul Irwin Forster
Taxa named by Anthony Bean
Argophyllaceae